N74 may refer to:

Roads
 Route des Grands Crus, in France
 N74 road (Ireland)
 Surigao–Davao Coastal Road, in the Philippines
 Nebraska Highway 74, in the United States

Other uses
 N74 (Long Island bus)
 BMW N74, an automobile engine
 London Buses route N74
 , a submarine of the Royal Navy
 Ndjébbana language
 Northrop N-74, a proposed transport aircraft
 Penns Cave Airport, near Centre Hall, Pennsylvania, United States